Mauricio Leonel Illesca Carreño (born 5 January 1972) is a Chilean former professional footballer who played as a striker for clubs in Chile, Spain and Colombia.

Club career
Then he joined Universidad de Chile youth system at the age of 12 and made his professional debut in a 1990 Copa Chile match versus Soinca Bata, scoring a goal in the 2–1 win. In 1992, he and his fellow Rodrigo Goldberg were loaned to Santiago Wanderers in the Chilean Segunda División. He is well remembered by the club fans due to the fact that he became the team goalscorer with 15 goals. In Chile, he also played for Deportes La Serena, O'Higgins, Colo-Colo, Audax Italiano, Deportes Concepción and Coquimbo Unido.

After a good season with Audax Italiano, in 1997 he had a brief step with Spanish club UD Las Palmas, making five appearances.

His last club was Independiente Santa Fe in Colombia, playing the last match in December 2000 versus América de Cali, becoming the four Chilean to play for the club after Carlos Molina, Juan Ramón Garrido and Luis Ceballos.

International career
Illesca represented Chile at under-20 level in the 1991 South American Championship.

At senior level, he was a substitute in the World Cup qualification matches versus Peru and Bolivia in 1997. In addition, he took part in the friendly match versus Millonarios in October 1997.

Personal life
Since he was a child, Illesca is nicknamed Bototo (Boot), like a comics character from Chilean magazine , whose name coincides with the Escuela Barrabases where he began his career.

As a curiosity, the news about the arrest of a drug trafficker nicknamed Bototo Illesca, like Mauricio, was shown in a Chilean TV program from Mega channel in 2011. His former fellow footballer Tincho Gálvez thought that it was about Mauricio and called him, realizing that their nicknames matched.

Post-retirement

He has studied and spent time in sport management and sport event organization. He is the executive director of Juventus Academy in Santiago, Chile, a franchise of Italian club Juventus, organizing sport events such as Bianconero Cup. Through his enterprise and football academy Futuro Azul (Blue Future), he has organized youth championships such as Coquimbo Cup, Santiago Kids and Santiago Cup Inter.

References

External links
 
 Mauricio Illesca at MemoriaWanderers 
 Mauricio Illesca at PlaymakerStats

1972 births
Living people
Sportspeople from Concepción, Chile
Chilean footballers
Chilean expatriate footballers
Chile international footballers
Chile under-20 international footballers
Universidad de Chile footballers
Santiago Wanderers footballers
Deportes La Serena footballers
O'Higgins F.C. footballers
Colo-Colo footballers
Audax Italiano footballers
UD Las Palmas players
Deportes Concepción (Chile) footballers
Ferro Carril Oeste footballers
Coquimbo Unido footballers
Independiente Santa Fe footballers
Chilean Primera División players
Primera B de Chile players
Segunda División players
Argentine Primera División players
Categoría Primera A players
Chilean expatriate sportspeople in Spain
Chilean expatriate sportspeople in Argentina
Chilean expatriate sportspeople in Colombia
Expatriate footballers in Spain
Expatriate footballers in Argentina
Expatriate footballers in Colombia
Association football forwards
Chilean football managers